Trendspotting is a British fashion and culture magazine based in the East End of London. It was founded in 2007 to highlight the culture, fashion and arts of London's trendy East End. Its current editor is Omar Butt and the art director is Arjun Mahedevan.

References

Fashion magazines published in the United Kingdom
Cultural magazines published in the United Kingdom
Independent magazines
Magazines published in London
Magazines established in 2007